The wrapper, lappa, or pagne is a colorful garment widely worn in West Africa by both men and women. It has formal and informal versions and varies from simple draped clothing to fully tailored ensembles. The formality of the wrapper depends on the fabric used to create or design it.

West African kaftan/boubou
In West Africa, a kaftan or caftan is a pull-over woman's robe. In French, this robe is called a boubou, pronounced boo-boo. The boubou is the traditional female attire in many West African countries including Senegal, Mali and other African countries. The boubou can be formal or informal attire. The formality of the kaftan depends upon the fabric used to create or design it.

Yoruba iro

In Yorubaland, Nigeria, the wrapper is commonly, called an iro in the Yoruba language, pronounced i-roh. The literal translation is "the act of wrapping." The wrapper is usually worn with a matching headscarf or head tie that is called a gele in Yoruba, pronounced geh-leh. A full wrapper ensemble consists of three garments, a blouse, called a buba, pronounced boo-bah the iro and a headscarf called a head tie in English and a gele in Yoruba. Traditional male attire is called a agbada. A wrapper takes metres of quality fabric.

Pagne

Pagne designates a certain cut (two by six yards) and type (single-sided "fancy" or double-sided "wax" prints) of untailored cotton textile, especially in Francophone West and Central Africa. Enormously popular in much of tropical Africa, the pagne cloth's usage and patterns may be used to convey by the wearer a number of social, economic—and sometimes even political—messages. It is similar—though distinct in size, expected pattern, and usage—to the Khanga, Kikoy or Chitenge of East and Southern Africa. From the pagne any number of garments may be created (the boubou, dresses, or western style suits) or it can be used untailored as a wrap, headtie, skirt, or tied as a sling for children or goods. The word pagne, likely derived from the Latin pannum, was a term introduced by merchants from the 16th Century and adopted by several African societies to identify often pre-existing textiles or garments distinct from a simple cloth. The Portuguese pano for cloth has become the French pagne (loincloth), Dutch paan, and others. It appears to have originally referred to East Asian textiles traded in East and West Africa, before becoming a term for a certain length (a yard, later two by six yards) of commercial printed cloth sold in coastal West Africa.

In the West

In the UK and North America, wrapper is also an older term for an informal house garment. Today, words such as housecoat and bathrobe (US) or dressing gown (UK) are usually employed instead.

Informal fabrics

 Batik—created with hot wax and dye.
 Fancy print—created by printing patterns on cloth. Unlike expensive wax prints, the design is printed on one side of the cotton fabric. Fancy prints are made in Europe, India, and West Africa. The most popular fancy print is known as the traditional print.
 Kente—traditionally woven by men. Kente is an informal fabric for anyone who is not a member of the Akan people. For Akans and many Ewes, kente is a formal cloth.
 Mudcloth—created by making mud drawings on cotton.
 Tie-dye—made by resist tying cotton then dipping in dye. In Nigeria, tie-dye is known as adire cloth.

Formal fabrics
 Aso Oke fabric—Woven by men, see Yoruba people.
 Cotton brocade—most brocade is produced in Guinea. Brocade is a shiny and polished cotton fabric.
 George cloth—George cloth originated in India, where it was used to make saris. The fabric became popular among African royal and noble families. The Ijaw people are known for their George wrappers.
 Lace—also known as shain-shain cloth'.
 Linen—linen kaftans are a formal style.
 Satin—satin fabrics are suitable for formal wear.
 African wax prints—traditional cloths in Africa. Most of them are printed in West Africa and China. Some African waxprints are made in the Netherlands, known as Dutch wax. In earlier times these were also produced in Great Britain. In a wax print, the pattern or design is printed on both sides of the cotton fabric. Waxprints are more expensive than fancy prints. Famous manufacturers are Vlisco in the Netherlands, Akosombo Textiles Limited in Ghana and Hitarget in China. Some smaller companies still produce genuine African wax prints. A well known brand is ABC Wax from Manchester, UK. Today ABC Wax is part of Akosombo Textiles Limited and printed in Ghana. There are many companies in Africa and China which use the wax print design for similar looking and much cheaper fancy textiles.

Wedding attire

The kaftan is always worn with a headscarf or head tie. During a wedding ceremony, the bride's kaftan is the same color as the groom's dashiki. The traditional color for West African weddings is white. The most popular non-traditional color is purple or lavender, the color of African royalty. Blue, the color of love, is also a common non-traditional color.
Most women wear black kaftans to funerals.
However, in some parts of Ghana and the United States, some women wear black-and-white prints, or black and red. The kaftan is the most popular attire for women of African descent throughout the African diaspora. African and African-American women wear a wide variety of dresses, and skirt sets made out of formal fabrics as formal wear. However, the kaftan and wrapper are the two traditional choices. It is not uncommon for a woman to wear a white wedding dress when the groom wears African attire. In the United States, African-American women wear the boubou for special occasions. The kaftan or boubou is worn at weddings; funerals; graduations; and Kwanzaa celebrations.

The men's robe is also called a boubou, see Senegalese kaftan for further information.

Buba
A buba (pronounced boo-bah) is a top or blouse. Buba is a Yoruba word that means the upper clothing. For women, the buba is worn with the iro (wrapper) and gele (head tie). For men, it is worn with sokoto (trousers) and fila (hat). The buba, sokoto/iro and fila/gele set is the traditional costume of the Yoruba people in South Western Nigeria.

See also
Dashiki
Ghanaian smock
Habesha kemis
Head tie
Headscarf
Kanga (African garment)—This wrapper is worn by women in East Africa
Kufi
National costume
Senegalese kaftan

References

Further reading
Ronke Luke-Boone, African Fabrics (Krause Publications 2001).
Diane Hoyt-Goldsmith, Celebrating Kwanzaa (Holiday House 1993).
Judith Perani and Norma Wolff, Cloth, Dress, and Art Patronage in Africa'' (Berg 1999).

Dresses
African clothing
Folk costumes